The Khakassia constituency (No.35) is a Russian legislative constituency covering the entirety of Khakassia.

Members elected

Election results

1993

|-
! colspan=2 style="background-color:#E9E9E9;text-align:left;vertical-align:top;" |Candidate
! style="background-color:#E9E9E9;text-align:left;vertical-align:top;" |Party
! style="background-color:#E9E9E9;text-align:right;" |Votes
! style="background-color:#E9E9E9;text-align:right;" |%
|-
|style="background-color:#0085BE"|
|align=left|Mikhail Mityukov
|align=left|Choice of Russia
|
|42.18%
|-
|style="background-color:#EA3C38"|
|align=left|Vladimir Ryzhov
|align=left|Civic Union
| -
|32.40%
|-
| colspan="5" style="background-color:#E9E9E9;"|
|- style="font-weight:bold"
| colspan="3" style="text-align:left;" | Total
| 
| 100%
|-
| colspan="5" style="background-color:#E9E9E9;"|
|- style="font-weight:bold"
| colspan="4" |Source:
|
|}

1995

|-
! colspan=2 style="background-color:#E9E9E9;text-align:left;vertical-align:top;" |Candidate
! style="background-color:#E9E9E9;text-align:left;vertical-align:top;" |Party
! style="background-color:#E9E9E9;text-align:right;" |Votes
! style="background-color:#E9E9E9;text-align:right;" |%
|-
|style="background-color:"|
|align=left|Aleksey Lebed
|align=left|Independent
|
|22.42%
|-
|style="background-color:"|
|align=left|Nadezhda Balakhchina
|align=left|Independent
|
|17.30%
|-
|style="background-color:#3A46CE"|
|align=left|Mikhail Mityukov (incumbent)
|align=left|Democratic Choice of Russia – United Democrats
|
|14.42%
|-
|style="background-color:"|
|align=left|Arkady Roitshtein
|align=left|Independent
|
|14.14%
|-
|style="background-color:"|
|align=left|Viktor Nosov
|align=left|Communist Party
|
|13.48%
|-
|style="background-color:#DA2021"|
|align=left|Sergey Sinelnikov
|align=left|Ivan Rybkin Bloc
|
|2.84%
|-
|style="background-color:"|
|align=left|Grigory Tarkhanov
|align=left|Independent
|
|2.75%
|-
|style="background-color:"|
|align=left|Yury Prokopyev
|align=left|Liberal Democratic Party
|
|2.47%
|-
|style="background-color:"|
|align=left|Aleksandr Samsonov
|align=left|Independent
|
|2.33%
|-
|style="background-color:#000000"|
|colspan=2 |against all
|
|5.50%
|-
| colspan="5" style="background-color:#E9E9E9;"|
|- style="font-weight:bold"
| colspan="3" style="text-align:left;" | Total
| 
| 100%
|-
| colspan="5" style="background-color:#E9E9E9;"|
|- style="font-weight:bold"
| colspan="4" |Source:
|
|}

1997 (June)
Results of the June 1 by-election were annulled due to low turnout (22.22%). Another by-election was scheduled for October 1997.

1997 (October)

|-
! colspan=2 style="background-color:#E9E9E9;text-align:left;vertical-align:top;" |Candidate
! style="background-color:#E9E9E9;text-align:left;vertical-align:top;" |Party
! style="background-color:#E9E9E9;text-align:right;" |Votes
! style="background-color:#E9E9E9;text-align:right;" |%
|-
|style="background-color:"|
|align=left|Georgy Maytakov
|align=left|Independent
|-
|20.99%
|-
| colspan="5" style="background-color:#E9E9E9;"|
|- style="font-weight:bold"
| colspan="3" style="text-align:left;" | Total
| -
| 100%
|-
| colspan="5" style="background-color:#E9E9E9;"|
|- style="font-weight:bold"
| colspan="4" |Source:
|
|}

1999

|-
! colspan=2 style="background-color:#E9E9E9;text-align:left;vertical-align:top;" |Candidate
! style="background-color:#E9E9E9;text-align:left;vertical-align:top;" |Party
! style="background-color:#E9E9E9;text-align:right;" |Votes
! style="background-color:#E9E9E9;text-align:right;" |%
|-
|style="background-color:"|
|align=left|Georgy Maytakov (incumbent)
|align=left|Independent
|
|41.90%
|-
|style="background-color:#E98282"|
|align=left|Nina Pilyugina
|align=left|Women of Russia
|
|22.26%
|-
|style="background-color:"|
|align=left|Gennady Azanov
|align=left|Independent
|
|8.77%
|-
|style="background-color:"|
|align=left|Nikolay Kochurov
|align=left|Independent
|
|8.04%
|-
|style="background-color:"|
|align=left|Viktor Kotelnikov
|align=left|Independent
|
|4.96%
|-
|style="background-color:"|
|align=left|Sergey Sapeyev
|align=left|Independent
|
|2.55%
|-
|style="background-color:"|
|align=left|Igor Chernolutsky
|align=left|Independent
|
|0.85%
|-
|style="background-color:#000000"|
|colspan=2 |against all
|
|9.36%
|-
| colspan="5" style="background-color:#E9E9E9;"|
|- style="font-weight:bold"
| colspan="3" style="text-align:left;" | Total
| 
| 100%
|-
| colspan="5" style="background-color:#E9E9E9;"|
|- style="font-weight:bold"
| colspan="4" |Source:
|
|}

2003

|-
! colspan=2 style="background-color:#E9E9E9;text-align:left;vertical-align:top;" |Candidate
! style="background-color:#E9E9E9;text-align:left;vertical-align:top;" |Party
! style="background-color:#E9E9E9;text-align:right;" |Votes
! style="background-color:#E9E9E9;text-align:right;" |%
|-
|style="background-color:"|
|align=left|Gennady Semigin
|align=left|Communist Party
|
|48.41%
|-
|style="background-color:"|
|align=left|Aleksandr Semenov
|align=left|Liberal Democratic Party
|
|19.98%
|-
|style="background-color:"|
|align=left|Yelena Kilchichakova
|align=left|Independent
|
|12.15%
|-
|style="background-color:"|
|align=left|Valery Chaptykov
|align=left|National Patriotic Forces
|
|3.86%
|-
|style="background-color:#7C73CC"|
|align=left|Yevgeny Sagalakov
|align=left|Great Russia–Eurasian Union
|
|2.32%
|-
|style="background-color:"|
|align=left|Aleksandr Mustonen
|align=left|Independent
|
|0.41%
|-
|style="background-color:#000000"|
|colspan=2 |against all
|
|11.52%
|-
| colspan="5" style="background-color:#E9E9E9;"|
|- style="font-weight:bold"
| colspan="3" style="text-align:left;" | Total
| 
| 100%
|-
| colspan="5" style="background-color:#E9E9E9;"|
|- style="font-weight:bold"
| colspan="4" |Source:
|
|}

2016

|-
! colspan=2 style="background-color:#E9E9E9;text-align:left;vertical-align:top;" |Candidate
! style="background-color:#E9E9E9;text-align:leftt;vertical-align:top;" |Party
! style="background-color:#E9E9E9;text-align:right;" |Votes
! style="background-color:#E9E9E9;text-align:right;" |%
|-
|style="background-color:"|
|align=left|Nadezhda Maksimova
|align=left|United Russia
|
|33.85%
|-
|style="background-color:"|
|align=left|Aleksandr Semenov
|align=left|Communist Party
|
|31.61%
|-
|style="background-color:"|
|align=left|Dmitry Bureyev
|align=left|Liberal Democratic Party
|
|11.34%
|-
|style="background:"| 
|align=left|Lyudmila Mindibekova
|align=left|A Just Russia
|
|9.12%
|-
|style="background:"| 
|align=left|Oleg Ivanov
|align=left|Yabloko
|
|7.46%
|-
|style="background-color:"|
|align=left|Viktor Veryasov
|align=left|The Greens
|
|2.75%
|-
| colspan="5" style="background-color:#E9E9E9;"|
|- style="font-weight:bold"
| colspan="3" style="text-align:left;" | Total
| 
| 100%
|-
| colspan="5" style="background-color:#E9E9E9;"|
|- style="font-weight:bold"
| colspan="4" |Source:
|
|}

2021

|-
! colspan=2 style="background-color:#E9E9E9;text-align:left;vertical-align:top;" |Candidate
! style="background-color:#E9E9E9;text-align:left;vertical-align:top;" |Party
! style="background-color:#E9E9E9;text-align:right;" |Votes
! style="background-color:#E9E9E9;text-align:right;" |%
|-
|style="background-color:"|
|align=left|Sergey Sokol
|align=left|United Russia
|
|28.97%
|-
|style="background-color:"|
|align=left|Valery Starostin
|align=left|Communist Party
|
|22.51%
|-
|style="background-color:"|
|align=left|Yevgeny Cheltygmashev
|align=left|Independent
|
|16.83%
|-
|style="background-color: " |
|align=left|Denis Brazauskas
|align=left|Communists of Russia
|
|6.70%
|-
|style="background:"| 
|align=left|Valery Ilyashchuk
|align=left|New People
|
|6.59%
|-
|style="background-color: " |
|align=left|Aleksandr Myakhar
|align=left|A Just Russia — For Truth
|
|4.52%
|-
|style="background-color:"|
|align=left|Mikhail Molchanov
|align=left|Liberal Democratic Party
|
|3.61%
|-
|style="background-color: "|
|align=left|Valery Maleyev
|align=left|Party of Pensioners
|
|2.70%
|-
|style="background-color:"|
|align=left|Yekaterina Yagupova
|align=left|The Greens
|
|2.45%
|-
|style="background:"| 
|align=left|Aleksey Khabarov
|align=left|Rodina
|
|1.14%
|-
| colspan="5" style="background-color:#E9E9E9;"|
|- style="font-weight:bold"
| colspan="3" style="text-align:left;" | Total
| 
| 100%
|-
| colspan="5" style="background-color:#E9E9E9;"|
|- style="font-weight:bold"
| colspan="4" |Source:
|
|}

Notes

References

Russian legislative constituencies
Politics of Khakassia